The Exploits of Fidelity Dove is a mystery novel by William Edward Vickers. It was first published in 1924 under the pen name David Durham and then again in 1935 under Vicker's more popular pen name Roy Vickers. It is considered one of the rarest mystery books of the twentieth century.

Plot overview

Fidelity Dove has been described as a femme fatale, a female master criminal, and an altruistic avenger. In the backmatter of one Vickers' other works she is described as "a lovely Puritan maid whose charm makes her irresistible - even to the detective whom she baffles at every turn."

Fidelity is an ash blonde with violet eyes, and is always clad in grey, an outward reflection of her puritan beliefs. She has the face of an angel and her beauty and charm have enabled her to gather a gang of highly skilled men: an actor, a scientist, a lawyer and others to assist her in her crimes. Her exploits consist of twelve tales:

 A Face and a Fortune
 Suspense
 The Genuine Old Master
 A Classic Forgery
 The Gulverbery Diamonds
 The Merchant Princess
 Fourteen Hundred Percent
 A Deal in Reputations
 The Laughing Nymph
 Proverbs and Prophets
 The Meanest Man in Europe
 The Great Kabul

There is a certain Robin Hood element to her crimes. Fidelity helps those who have been wronged, cheated or exploited, but in almost every tale her actions result in profits for herself and her gang of men.

Critical Reception

Fidelity Dove's exploits have been fairly well received. In 1970 The New York Times Book Review ranked Vickers' The Exploits of Fidelity Dove and The Department of Dead Ends among the finest contemporary crime writing.
Otto Penzler, writing in the Encyclopedia of Mystery and Detection (1976) described Miss Dove as “One of the most inventive and successful of all crooks.” Dorothy L. Sayers ranked her among the best female master criminals including her alongside John Kendrick Bangs' Mrs. Raffles, Frederick Irving Anderson's Sophie Lang, and Edgar Wallace's Four Square Jane.

References

Female characters in literature
Fictional professional thieves
Literary characters introduced in 1924